Leticia Cherpe de Souza (born 6 May 1996) is a Brazilian sprinter. She competed in the 4 × 400 m relay at the 2016 Olympics.

References

1996 births
Living people
Brazilian female sprinters
Olympic athletes of Brazil
Athletes (track and field) at the 2016 Summer Olympics
Baylor Bears women's track and field athletes
Athletes from São Paulo
21st-century Brazilian women